Seafood pizza is pizza prepared with seafood as a primary ingredient. Many types of seafood ingredients in fresh, frozen or canned forms may be used on seafood pizza. Some retail pizza chains, as well as smaller restaurants, offer seafood pizzas to consumers.

Ingredients
Various seafood can be used to prepare the dish, such as fish (including salmon, tuna, anchovy), shellfish, clams, scallops, mussels, shrimp, squid, lobster and scungilli (sea snail), among others. Imitation seafood may also be used. Fresh or frozen seafood may be used, and some versions use canned seafood, such as canned tuna.

Varieties

Pizza alla Napoletana
Pizza alla napoletana is topped with tomato, mozzarella, anchovies and olive oil (thus, what in Naples is called pizza romana, in Rome is called pizza napoletana).

Pizza ai Frutti di Mare
Frutti di Mare is an Italian type of pizza that may be served with scampi, mussels or squid. It typically lacks cheese, with the seafood being served atop a tomato sauce.

Tuna and Onions Pizza
A popular italian variety is the Tuna and Onions Pizza (pizza con tonno e cipolle), topped with tomato, mozzarella, canned tuna, red onions slices, and olive oil.

Pizza pescatore
A variety of seafood pizza is pizza pescatore (fisherman's pizza), which is prepared with mussels and squid.

Commercial varieties

Chain restaurants
Domino's Pizza offers a seafood pizza in Vietnam, which (as of December 2012) was the company's "best-selling product in Vietnam".

Pizza Hut has offered a seafood pizza in Malaysia and India called "Seafood symphony". The Indian Pizza Hut version was prepared with fresh seafood from the waters of Kochi, India.

Smaller companies
Barleycorn Pizza in Owego, New York, developed a specialty seafood pizza prepared with garlic, crab legs, shrimp and scallops.

Benedetti's Pizza in Manzanillo, Mexico, specializes in seafood pizza, including those prepared with anchovy and smoked oysters.

Ciro's Restaurant & Lounge in Mahopac, New York, developed a seafood pizza prepared with clams, shrimp, mussels and scungilli.

Frank Pepe Pizzeria Napoletana in New Haven, Connecticut, is well known for its white clam pizza, featuring fresh littleneck clams.

Ko Olina's Pizza Corner restaurant in Kapolei, Hawaii, developed a pizza called "Original Hawaiian Poke Pizza", which uses poke, a raw seafood salad, on pizza. The poke is placed atop the pizza after the pizza has been cooked. Another dish the restaurant serves is a seafood pizza that includes lobster cream sauce in its preparation.

World's most expensive pizza
The world's most expensive pizza listed by Guinness World Records is a  seafood pizza called the "C6" that is prepared at Steveston Pizza Co. restaurant in Steveston, British Columbia (in the Metro Vancouver area) which costs C$850. The pizza includes lobster, caviar, tiger prawns and smoked salmon. Each slice is worth C$85, because it is divided into 10 slices. It has to be pre-ordered one day in advance. The title for world's most expensive pizza was previously held by a C$178 pizza prepared with white truffle by Gordon Ramsay. As of September 2014, Guinness World Records still lists the Gordon Ramsay pizza on their website.

There are several instances of more expensive pizzas, such as the US$4,200 “Pizza Royale 007" at Haggis restaurant in Glasgow, Scotland, which has caviar, lobster and is topped with 24-carat gold leaf, and the US$1,000 caviar pizza made by Nino's Bellissima pizzeria in New York City, New York. However, these are not officially recognized by Guinness World Records.

See also

 List of pizza varieties by country
 List of seafood dishes

References

Further reading

External links

 "Seafood pizza ideas from Chef Wanted with Anne Burrell". Paula Duffy. 2013.

Pizza varieties
Seafood dishes